Daniel Popescu (born 20 February 1988) is a Romanian footballer who plays as a left back for Oțelul Galați.

Career statistics

Club

Honours

Club
Steaua București
League Cup: 2015–16

References

External links
 
 

1988 births
Living people
People from Tulcea
Romanian footballers
Association football defenders
Liga I players
Liga II players
FCM Dunărea Galați players
ASC Oțelul Galați players
ACS Poli Timișoara players
FC Steaua București players
CS Concordia Chiajna players
FC Steaua II București players
ASC Daco-Getica București players
CSM Slatina footballers